Myopsyche nervalis is a moth of the  subfamily Arctiinae. It was described by Strand in 1912. It is found in Equatorial Guinea and Gabon.

References

 Natural History Museum Lepidoptera generic names catalog

Arctiinae
Moths described in 1912